Party Animal(s) may refer to:

Music 
 Party Animals (music group), a Dutch pop-gabber group
 Party Animals (album), by Turbonegro, 2005
 "Party Animal", a song by James Ingram from It's Your Night
 "Party Animal", a song by K-Town Clan entered in the ABU Radio Song Festival 2012
 "Party Animal", a song by M.O.D. from Surfin' M.O.D.
 "Party Animal", a song by Timati from SWAGG
 "Party Animal" or "Gyal You a Party Animal", a song by Charly Black

Film 

The Party Animal, a 1985 film directed by David Beaird
 Party Animals, a short film by Grady Cooper

Television 
 Party Animals (TV series), a 2007 British drama series
 Party Animals, a Scottish game show presented by Bryan Burnett

Episodes
 "Party Animal" (Happy Tree Friends)
 "Party Animal" (That's So Raven)
 "Party Animals" (Rugrats)
 "Party Animals" (Shaun the Sheep)

Video games 

 Party Animals (video game), an upcoming multiplayer brawler game
 Viva Piñata: Party Animals, a 2007 video game